Rūdolfs is a Latvian masculine given name, a cognate of the English given name Rudolph and may refer to:
Rūdolfs Balcers (born 1997), Latvian ice hockey player
Rūdolfs Bārda (1903–1991), Latvian footballer
Rūdolfs Baumanis (1909–1998), Latvian sports shooter 
Rūdolfs Blaumanis (1863–1908), Latvian writer, journalist and playwright 
Rūdolfs Gaitars (1907–1945), Latvian military Waffen-Obersturmführer in the Waffen SS during World War II 
Rūdolfs Jurciņš (1909–1948), Latvian basketball center and Olympic competitor
Rūdolfs Kociņš (1907-1990), Latvian military leader, one of the principal commanders of Battle of More
Rūdolfs Kundrāts (1904–????), Latvian football defender
Rūdolfs Ronis (1897–1970), Latvian wrestler and Olympic competitor
Rūdolfs Vītols (????–1942), Latvian track and field athlete and Olympic competitor

Latvian masculine given names